is a public university, located in the city of Fukushima, Japan.

History
The predecessor of the school was Fukushima Woman's Medical School, and was established in 1944.  It was chartered as a university in 1950.

Academic Departments and Facilities 
 School of Medicine - offers undergraduate medical education. 
 School of Nursing - founded in 1988 to offer undergraduate nursing education (BSN). 
 School of Graduate Education - graduate programs in medicine and nursing. 
 Fukushima Medical University Hospital - 778-bed acute care hospital.
 Radiation Medical Science Center - Founded in 2011 after Great East Japan Earthquake and subsequent Fukushima Daiichi nuclear plant accident.

External links
Fukushima Medical University   
 Fukushima Medical University  
 

Educational institutions established in 1944
Public universities in Japan
Universities and colleges in Fukushima Prefecture
Medical schools in Japan
Nursing schools in Japan
1944 establishments in Japan
Fukushima (city)